Macrozamia is a genus of around forty species of cycads, family Zamiaceae, all of which are endemic to Australia. Many parts of the plant have been utilised for food and material, most of which is toxic if not processed correctly.

Description 
A genus of cycads with partially submerged bole or tree, small to medium height, bearing a crown of palm-like fronds. The dioecious plants bear large cones, becoming even larger when ripening on the female, containing reproductive parts of great size.

Distribution 
The greatest diversity of species occurs in eastern Australia, in southeast Queensland and New South Wales, with one species in the Macdonnell Ranges of Northern Territory and three in the southwest region of Australia.

Taxonomy 

The first description of the genus was published in 1842 by Friedrich Anton Wilhelm Miquel in his Monographia Cycadearum, without designating a type.

The common name "burrawang", originally referring to M. communis in the Daruk Australian Aboriginal language, is often used for all the species in the genus.
Informal names published in state listing for the genus include 'rickets' (Bailey, 1931) in Queensland, a name also used in Western Australia for the symptoms of ingestion of species by cattle,
and terms zamia, zamia palm, burrawang palm (Ross, 1989) and djeeri (Hopper, 2014) continued to be noted by New South Wales, QLD and W.A. authors in specific and generic usages.

Species

References

External links

 
Endemic flora of Australia
Cycadophyta of Australia
Taxa named by Friedrich Anton Wilhelm Miquel